= Islamic concept of sovereignty =

Politics in Islam

The Islamic concept of sovereignty differs from the western principles of international custom and law established by the Treaty of Westphalia. An important element of this is the Ummah — the community of Muslims as a whole. Devout Muslims consider that there is no division between religion and politics and so government should be based upon the Qur'an, following the word of God in a unified way, as in the first Caliphate.
